Social advertising is the use of advertising to inform the public about a social issue or to influence their behavior.

While social advertising campaigns are often successful in raising awareness, they are typically unsuccessful in producing long-term behavior change of the type that can be achieved through the use of social marketing. Social advertising may, however, form a part of a social marketing intervention.

Social advertising makes people understand what the government does.

See also
 Social marketing
 Social advertising (social relationships)

References

Advertising
Social issues